Nitric oxide synthase 1 (neuronal), also known as NOS1, is an enzyme that in humans is encoded by the NOS1 gene.

Function 
Nitric oxide synthases (NOSs) are a family of synthases that catalyze the production of nitric oxide (NO) from L-arginine. NO is a chemical messenger with diverse functions throughout the body depending on its enzymatic source and tissue localization. In the brain and peripheral nervous system, where NOS1 is largely present, NO displays many properties of a neurotransmitter and may be involved in long term potentiation. It is implicated in neurotoxicity associated with stroke and neurodegenerative diseases, neural regulation of smooth muscle, including peristalsis and sphincter relaxation, and penile erection. NO is also responsible for endothelium-derived relaxing factor activity regulating blood pressure as produced from its related enzyme NOS3. In macrophages, NO mediates tumoricidal and bactericidal actions, as produced from its related enzyme NOS2. Various pharmacological inhibitors of NO synthases (NOS) block these effects, but further distinction of their function has been elucidated by animal models in which these specific genes have been inactivated. Neuronal NOS (NOS1), Endothelial NOS (NOS3), and Inducible NOS macrophage NOS are distinct isoforms. Both the neuronal and the macrophage forms are unusual among oxidative enzymes in requiring several electron donors: flavin adenine dinucleotide (FAD), flavin mononucleotide (FMN), NADPH, and tetrahydrobiopterin.

Clinical significance 

It has been implicated in asthma, schizophrenia, restless leg syndrome, and psychostimulant neurotoxicity. It has also been investigated with respect to bipolar disorder and air pollution exposure.

Interactions 

NOS1 has been shown to interact with DLG4 and NOS1AP.

See also 
Nitric oxide synthase

References

Further reading 

 
 
 

Biology of bipolar disorder
EC 1.14.13